Aegis is a Filipino rock band formed in 1995. Formerly known as AG's Soundtrippers in clubs and lounges all over Japan. The band is composed of sisters Juliet, Mercy, and Ken Sunot on lead vocals, only-male member Rey Abenoja on vocals and guitars, Stella Pabico on keyboards, Rowena Adriano on bass guitar and Vilma Goloviogo on drums. The group changed its name to Aegis (which means "shield" or "protection") upon signing with Alpha Records in 1998. The band's songs were featured in the musical Rak of Aegis.

Members
 Juliet Sunot – lead vocals
 Mercy Sunot – lead vocals
 Ken Sunot – lead vocals
 Stella Pabico – keyboard
 Rey Abenoja – vocals, lead guitar
 Rowena Adriano – bass guitar
 Vilma Goloviogo – drums

Discography

Studio albums

Singles
 Ang sa Iyo Ay Akin (2021)

References

Filipino rock music groups
Musical groups established in 1995
Musical groups from Quezon City
Star Music artists
Viva Records (Philippines) artists